Kazakhmys Group is a vertically integrated holding company whose key assets are concentrated in the mining industry and non-ferrous metallurgy. It was established and registered in the form of a joint-stock company in August 1997. On 14 January 2005, the company was re-registered from a joint-stock company into a limited liability partnership.

The Group operates in the mining industry, the main activity of the group is the extraction and processing of copper ore into cathode copper and copper wire rod, refining and sale of precious metals and other associated products obtained as a result of copper mining and processing.

In October 2014, Kazakhmys PLC was divided into the private Kazakhmys Corporation LLP and the public KAZ Minerals Plc, while Vladimir Kim still holds control in both companies.

Owners and management 
The ultimate controlling member of the Group, with a 70% ownership percentage, is Kim Vladimir Sergeevich, a citizen of the Republic of Kazakhstan. 30% of the ownership of the Group belongs to Eduard Viktorovich Ogay, a citizen of the Republic of Kazakhstan.

Activity 
Kazakhmys ranks 20th in the world in the production of copper in concentrate (271 thousand tons) and 12th in the production of rough and cathode copper (377 and 365 thousand tons, respectively, taking into account raw materials).

In 2020, the contribution of the Kazakhmys Group allowed the Republic of Kazakhstan to take the 11th place in the world ranking of silver producing countries (279 tons, 51% of the total production in the country).

According to the results of 2020, the Group ranks 3rd in the Republic of Kazakhstan in terms of electricity generation with a production volume of 7,267.53 million kWh.

Assets 
Kazakhmys Group owns 13 operating mines (10 underground and 3 open), 6 processing plants and two copper smelting plants (Zhezkazgan and Balkhash copper Smelting Plant), one of which is under reconstruction, 3 power plants (GRES Topar LLP, Zhezkazgan and Balkhash thermal power plants) and one coal mine of Kazakhmys Coal LLP.

Performance indicators 
In 2020, the Kazakhmys Group of Companies achieved significant success in the extraction of copper and other valuable metals. According to the results of the year, the Group has fulfilled the production plan for ore extraction by 100.76%. A total of 28 million 655 thousand tons of ore were mined. The average copper content in the mined ore was 1%, with a plan of 0.94%. In total, 31.3 million tons of ore were processed by Kazakhmys processing plants in 2020. Also in 2020 , the Group produced:

- cathode copper – 258.36 thousand tons, exceeding targets by 745 tons, for the same period last year – 245.92 thousand tons, an increase of 12.44 thousand tons (+5.06%);

- gold bullion 5,950 kg, for the same period last year 4,428 kg, an increase of 1,522 kg (+34.4%);

- silver in ingots and granules 262.18 kg, for the same period last year – 223.47 kg, an increase of 38.71 kg (+17.32%).

The Group's revenue from the sale of copper cathode in 2020 amounted to 583.871 million tenge, EBITDA in 2020 amounted to 249.610 million tenge.

Structure 
Subsidiaries

Kazakhmys Smelting LLP (Kazakhmys Smelting)

Kazakhmys Distribution LLP

Kazakhmys Maintenance Services LLP

Kazakhmys Energy LLP (Kazakhmys Energy)

KAZ GREEN ENERGY LLP

LLP "Main distribution power station Topar"

Kazakhmys Coal LLP (Kazakhmys Coal)

"Kazakhmys Barlau"

LLP "Maker (Maker)"

LLP "Kazphosphate

History
In April 1931, Balkhashmet was established, in 1938 copper was smelted in Balkhash, in 1943 the BMZ plant began work in Zhezkazgan.

In 1913, the Spassky Joint Stock Company was registered in Zhezkazgan, the head was an Englishman Leslie Urquhart.

The company was nationalized after the October Revolution in the 1920s.

References

External links
Official site

 
Companies established in 1992
Copper mining companies of the United Kingdom
Copper mines in Kazakhstan
Mining companies of the Soviet Union
Holding companies established in 2005
Companies formerly listed on the Hong Kong Stock Exchange